CLO may refer to:

Institutional positions
 Chief Learning Officer, training post
 Chief Legal Officer of a legal department

Locations
 Alfonso Bonilla Aragón International Airport, Palmira, Colombia, IATA code 
 Civic Light Opera (disambiguation), several US theatres
Cło, Świętokrzyskie Voivodeship, Gmina Kazimierza Wielka, Kazimierza County, Poland

Organizations
 Central Legal Office of NHS Scotland
 Conselh de la Lenga Occitana (Occitan Language Council)
 Cooperative Living Organization, a housing cooperative in Gainesville, FL, US
 Federation of Civil Service Organizations (Centrale van Landsdienaren Organisaties), Suriname

Technical terms
 Collateralized loan obligation, an asset-backed security
 Color Light Output or color brightness of a projector

Other uses 
Alberto Clò (born 1947), Italian politician and academic
Campylobacter-like organism test, rapid test for the most common cause of gastric ulcer
Chlorine monoxide, a chemical radical
Clo the Cow, advertising mascot of Clover Stornetta Farms
Hypochlorite ion (ClO−), composed of chlorine and oxygen
 Unit of clothing insulation

See also 
 Cee Lo